Moment of Rarities is the first compilation album released from Boston  underground hip hop  duo 7L & Esoteric. Released on July 26, 2005 under Babygrande Records, the album contains songs that were unreleased up to 2005.

Track listing

References

7L & Esoteric albums
2005 compilation albums
Babygrande Records compilation albums